"Lucifer" is a song by Blue System. It is the first (not counting an "overture") song on their 1991 fifth studio album, Seeds of Heaven, and was released as its lead single.

The single debuted at number 91 in Germany for the week of April 15, 1991, re-entered at number 25 two weeks later and stayed there for one more week before dropping to number 26.

Composition 
The song is written and produced by Dieter Bohlen.

Charts

References 

1991 songs
1991 singles
Blue System songs
Hansa Records singles
Songs written by Dieter Bohlen
Song recordings produced by Dieter Bohlen